The Lincoln American Tower is a 22-story building located at the corner of North Main and Court streets in Memphis, Tennessee. It is also a historical landmark, one of the first steel frame skyscrapers built in Memphis. The tower underwent a six-year refurbishing project starting in 2002, and despite a fire in 2006, is now open and accepting tenants.

The building currently features 31 residential apartments, 3 floors of commercial offices, and New York-based Ceriello Fine Foods on the ground floor.

History
The site itself has a unique history, as it is located near the location of Irving Block Prison, which was on the north side of Court Square, which was used by the Union Army to house Confederate sympathizers during the Civil War. Freeing prisoners from Irving Block Prison was one of the three major objectives of Maj. Gen. Nathan Bedford Forrest's raid in the Second Battle of Memphis.

In 1924, the president of the Memphis branch of the Columbia Mutual Insurance Company (later renamed to the Lincoln American Insurance Company), Lloyd Binford, had the gleaming white tower built overlooking Court Square. Binford later made an infamous name for himself across the country as head of the Memphis Censor Board, which he ran from his own offices on the top floor of the building.

The Lincoln American Tower was added to the National Register of Historic Places in 1978.

On October 6, 2006, the building was damaged by fire after embers from a major fire at the nearby First United Methodist Church were carried several blocks by strong winds. The result lit the top few floors of the building on fire, including the roof, and filled much of downtown Memphis with smoke. The nearby Court Annex building was destroyed in the same fire.

Despite the fire, the renovation of the building continued, and the first tenants in 2008 were the Plough Foundation, who leased  of space in the building.

Design

The building’s frame is made of steel and is covered in concrete. This Gothic revival building has an exterior covered in a white terra cotta glaze. The building features pilasters, four for structural support and three for visual effect. The reveals on the pilasters show where the steel frame is within the building.  This tower features decorative bas-reliefs across the façade; the most noteworthy one is the two woman and two children modeled after Lloyd Binford's children. Piers lead up to the pyramidal cap. There are highly ornamented cornices around the building.

The tower is a replica of New York's Woolworth Building, at one-third scale.

Columbian Mutual Life Assurance Society 

The Columbian Mutual Life Assurance Society was founded in 1903 as the "Columbian Woodmen". Membership was open to men and women. In 1923 there were 24,039 members in 831 lodges spread out across South Carolina, Georgia, Florida, Alabama, Mississippi, Louisiana, Arkansas, Texas, Oklahoma, Missouri, Tennessee, Kentucky, Illinois and Pennsylvania. Under National President Lloyd T. Binford a number of changes were made, including the change of name to the Columbian Mutual Life Assurance Society, the dropping of fraternal titles and a move of the headquarters from Atlanta to Memphis.

See also
List of tallest buildings in Memphis
List of North American fraternal benefit orders
National Register of Historic Places listings in Shelby County, Tennessee

References

Skyscraper office buildings in Memphis, Tennessee
Residential skyscrapers in Memphis, Tennessee
Commercial buildings completed in 1924
Office buildings on the National Register of Historic Places in Tennessee
Apartment buildings in Tennessee
National Register of Historic Places in Memphis, Tennessee
1924 establishments in Tennessee